Denise Michele (sometimes credited as Denise Kellogg, born June 12, 1953) was Playboy magazine's Playmate of the Month for April 1976. She was born in San Francisco, California and moved to Oahu, Hawaii when she was eight years old, her father's home state. Her Playboy pictorial was shot by Ken Marcus.

She appears on the album cover of Robert Palmer's Some People Can Do What They Like (1976), playing strip poker with Palmer and has numerous modeling credits outside of Playboy, including Almond Joy, Pan Am and Calavo.

She is married to American film director David Kellogg. They have two boys and a girl and reside in Hidden Hills, California, .

She had some minor film roles such as in Tai-Pan, a 1986 film based on the second novel in James Clavell's Asian Saga, and stunt work in Big Trouble in Little China, a 1986 action film, directed by John Carpenter. Michele also appeared in television commercials and the film Three on a Date in 1978, Hawaii Five-O in Nine Dragons 1976 and The Jeffersons in 1985.

References

External links
 
 

1953 births
Living people
1970s Playboy Playmates
American Playboy Playmates of Asian descent
People from Hawaii
American film actresses
American television actresses
21st-century American women